Companys, procés a Catalunya is a 1979 Spanish Catalan drama film directed by Josep Maria Forn, based on the last months of the life of the President of Catalonia, Lluís Companys, in which he shows his detention by the Nazis and his subsequent execution by the Spanish Francoists. It competed in the Un Certain Regard section at the 1979 Cannes Film Festival.

Cast
 Luis Iriondo - Lluís Companys
 Marta Angelat - Àngela
 Montserrat Carulla - Ramona Companys
 Xabier Elorriaga - Fortuny
 Pau Garsaball - Miquel
 Agustín González - Miembro del Tribunal
 Alfred Lucchetti - Juez instructor
 Marta May - Carme Ballester
 Biel Moll - Urraca Pastor
 Ovidi Montllor - Jordi
 Conrado Tortosa 'Pipper' - García
 Rafael Anglada - Martí

References

External links

1979 films
Spanish drama films
Catalan films
1970s Spanish-language films
Catalan-language films
1979 drama films
Films directed by Josep Maria Forn
1970s Spanish films